The 2022 Santa Cruz Challenger, also known as Dove MEN + CARE Challenger Bolivia, was a professional tennis tournament played on clay courts. It was the first edition of the tournament which was part of the 2022 ATP Challenger Tour. It took place in Santa Cruz de la Sierra, Bolivia between 24 and 30 January 2022.

Singles main-draw entrants

Seeds

 1 Rankings are as of 17 January 2022.

Other entrants
The following players received wildcards into the singles main draw:
  Boris Arias
  Murkel Dellien
  Federico Zeballos

The following player received entry into the singles main draw as an alternate:
  Nicolás Álvarez

The following players received entry from the qualifying draw:
  Pedro Cachín
  Matías Franco Descotte
  Diego Hidalgo
  Juan Carlos Prado Angelo
  Cristian Rodríguez
  Gonzalo Villanueva

The following player received entry as a lucky loser:
  Michel Vernier

Champions

Singles

  Francisco Cerúndolo def.  Camilo Ugo Carabelli 6–4, 6–3.

Doubles

  Diego Hidalgo /  Cristian Rodríguez def.  Andrej Martin /  Tristan-Samuel Weissborn 4–6, 6–3, [10–8].

References

2022 ATP Challenger Tour
2022 in Bolivian sport
January 2022 sports events in South America